The 2019 Emporia State Hornets football team represents Emporia State University in the 2019 NCAA Division II football season. The Hornets play their home games on Jones Field at Francis G. Welch Stadium in Emporia, Kansas, as they have done since 1937. 2019 is the 122nd season in school history. The Hornets are led by head coach Garin Higgins, who is in his 18th season overall, and 13th season at Emporia State as head coach. Emporia State has been a member of the Mid-America Intercollegiate Athletics Association (MIAA) since 1991.

Preseason
The Hornets enter the 2018 season after finishing with an 8–4 overall, 7–4 in conference play last season under Higgins. The 2019 MIAA Media Day will be held on July 31, where conference preseason rankings will be released.

New changes occurred this year in conference play. With Lindenwood and Southwest Baptist's departures in July 2019, Lincoln re-joined MIAA football play after four seasons in the Great Lakes Valley Conference.

On July 31, 2019, the Hornets were chosen to finish 6th in the conference preseason polls by the coaches and media.

Personnel

Coaching staff
Along with Higgins, there are 9 assistants.

Roster

Schedule

Source:

Game notes, regular season

Northeastern State

Pittsburg State

Nebraska–Kearney

Lincoln (MO)

Northwest Missouri

Fort Hays State

Central Missouri

Missouri Western

Washburn

Missouri Southern

Central Oklahoma

References

Emporia State
Emporia State Hornets football seasons
Emporia State Hornets football